The 1989 Estoril Open was a women's tennis tournament played on outdoor clay courts at the Estoril Court Central in Oeiras, Portugal that was part of the Category 2 tier  of the 1989 WTA Tour. It was the first edition of the tournament and was held from 17 July through 23 July 1989. Third-seeded Isabel Cueto won the singles title.

Finals

Singles

 Isabel Cueto defeated  Sandra Cecchini 7–6(7–3), 6–2
 It was Cueto's 1st title of the year and the 4th of her career.

Doubles

 Iva Budařová /  Regina Rajchrtová defeated  Gaby Castro /  Conchita Martínez 6–2, 6–4
 It was Budařová's only title of the year and the 4th of her career. It was Rajchrtová's only title of the year and the 1st of her career.

External links
 ITF tournament edition details
 Tournament draws